The Mazantic Shale is a geologic formation in Chiapas, Mexico.  It was deposited during the Early Miocene (Aquitanian). The formation comprises dark gray shales that were deposited in a marine environment. It preserves fossils, such as the turtle Allaeochelys liliae. Amber has been recovered from it.

See also

 List of fossiliferous stratigraphic units in Mexico

References

Neogene Mexico
Shale formations